Bârgău may refer to:

Bârgău, a village in the commune Cicârlău, Maramureș County
Bârgău (river), a river in Bistrița-Năsăud County, Romania
Bârgău Mountains, mountain range in Romania, part of the Carpathian Mountains
Bârgău Pass or Borgo Pass, alternative names for the Tihuța Pass in Romania
Bistrița Bârgăului, a commune in Bistrița-Năsăud County, Romania
Josenii Bârgăului, a commune in Bistrița-Năsăud County, Romania
Prundu Bârgăului, a commune in Bistrița-Năsăud County, Romania
Tiha Bârgăului, a commune in Bistrița-Năsăud County, Romania